G&R may refer to:

Gradshteyn and Ryzhik, aka Table of Integrals, Series, and Products, a classical book in mathematics
Guns N' Roses, an American rock band